The 2016–17 season was SK Slavia Prague's 24th season in the Czech First League. The team competed in Czech First League and the Czech Cup.

Season Events

On 6 May, Slavia gathered three points against Bohemians Prague (match-week 27), which was sufficient to be mathematically assured that the team will finish ahead of Sparta in the league table.

Squad

Out on loan

Transfers

In

Loans in

Out

 Barák's move was announced on the above date, becoming official at the end of the season.

Loans out

Released

Competitions

Overall record

Czech First League

League table

Results summary

Results by round

Matches

Czech Cup

UEFA Europa League

Qualifying rounds

Second qualifying round

Third qualifying round

Play-off round

Squad statistics

Appearances and goals

|-
|colspan="14"|Players away from Slavia Prague on loan:

|-
|colspan="14"|Players who left Slavia Prague during the season:

|}

Goal scorers

Disciplinary record

Notes

References

External links
Official website

Slavia Prague
SK Slavia Prague seasons
Slavia Prague
Czech Republic football championship-winning seasons